The Rheinpark (meaning: Rhine park) is a 40 hectare (0,4 km²) large urban park along the right bank of the river Rhine in Cologne, Germany. The park lies between the Cologne districts of Deutz and Mülheim and includes a beach club, an open-air theater (the Tanzbrunnen) and a Roman Thermae styled public bath (the Claudius-Therme). It was voted Germany's best park in 2007.

History 
Originally laid out according to plans by landscape architect Fritz Encke and opened in 1913, the park today mirrors the redesign of the park for the Bundesgartenschau in 1957. 

Major public events in the history of the park were:  
 Cologne Werkbund Exhibition, 1914
 Internationale Presse-Ausstellung 1928
 Bundesgartenschau 1957
 Bundesgartenschau 1971

Venues 
Tanzbrunnen Theater

References

External links 

 official site

Urban public parks
Parks in Germany
Tourist attractions in Cologne
Innenstadt, Cologne
World's fair sites in Germany